A revised edition of the statutes is an edition of the Revised Statutes in the United Kingdom  (there being more than one edition). These editions are published by authority.

In 1861 the Parliament of the United Kingdom passed the first of a long series of Statute Law Revision Acts. The most important action, was the nomination of Statute Law Committee by Lord Chancellor Cairns in 1868, the practical result of which was the issuing of the first edition of the Revised Statutes in eighteen volumes, bringing the revision of statute law down to 1886.

The third edition of The Statutes Revised was published by HMSO in 1950. The fourth revised edition of the statutes was called Statutes in Force.

The Statute Law Committee was appointed for the purpose of superintending the publication of the first revised edition of the statutes.

For the purpose of citation "Statutes Revised" may be abbreviated to "Rev Stat".

Section 3 of the Statute Law Revision Act 1948 now provides:

Section 3(1) of the Statute Law Revision Act 1950 now provides:

Without prejudice to any other saving contained in the Statute Law Revision Act 1950, an omission made under the authority of section 3 of that Act does not affect the construction or interpretation of any statute.

Where any Act cites or refers to another Act otherwise than by its short title, the short title may, in any revised edition of the statutes printed by authority, be printed in substitution for such citation or reference.

Where an Act cites another Act by year, statute, session or chapter, or a section or other portion of another Act by number or letter, the reference must, unless the contrary intention appears, be read as referring, in the case of Acts included in any revised edition of the statutes printed by authority, to that edition.

History

Section 1 of the Statute Law Revision Act 1948 formerly provided that every part of a title, preamble, or recital specified after the words "in part, namely," in connection with an Act mentioned in the First Schedule to that Act might be omitted from any revised edition of the statutes published by authority after the passing of that Act, and there might be added in the said edition such brief statement of the Acts, officers, persons, and things mentioned in the title, preamble, or recital, as might in consequence of such omission appear necessary.

Sections 3(1)(c) to (f) of that Act formerly authorised the omission of:

(c) in any enactment relating to the courts now merged in the Supreme Court the words "debt," "suit," "bill," "plaint," "proceeding" or any of those words occurring after or in connection with the word "action";
(d) in any enactment relating to Scotland the word "stewartry" occurring in connection with the word "shire," "sheriffdom" or "county," and the word "stewart" occurring in connection with the word "sheriff," whether any of these words be used in the singular or the plural;
(e) the words "of", "and" or "or" were used in connection with any word omitted by virtue of paragraphs (c) and (d) of this subsection; and 
(f) enactments or words in respect of matters exclusively relating to territory within the jurisdiction of a self-governing Dominion.

See also section 3 of the Statute Law Revision (No. 2) Act 1890, section 4 of the Statute Law Revision Act 1894, and section 3 of the Statute Law Revision Act 1927.

Northern Ireland
The Revised Edition of The Irish Statutes was published by authority in 1885. It was prepared by W F Cullinan.

The official revised version of the primary legislation of Northern Ireland is called The Northern Ireland Statutes Revised or The Statutes Revised: Northern Ireland.

See section 5 of the Statute Law Revision Act 1950, the Statute Law Revision Act (Northern Ireland) 1952 and section 47(3) of the Interpretation Act (Northern Ireland) 1954.

Scotland
See sections 10(2)(a) and 11(2)(a) of the Interpretation and Legislative Reform (Scotland) Act 2010 (asp 10).

The First Revised Edition was published in 1908. It was based on the Record Edition. The Second Revised Edition of The Acts of the Parliaments of Scotland 1424-1707 was published by authority in 1966. It was prepared by the Scottish Parliamentary Draftsmen and based on the First Edition. The text of the Acts of the Parliaments of Scotland in Statutes in Force was taken from the Second Revised Edition.

See also
Oregon Revised Statutes
Revised Statutes of the United States
UK Statute Law Database

Notes

References
John E Pemberton and G Chandler. "The Statutes Revised" and "Statutes in Force: Official Revised Edition" in British Official Publications: Library and Technical Information. Pergamon Press Ltd. Second Revised Edition. 1973. . Page 130 to 132.
John E Pemberton, "Loose Leaf Statutes" (1969) 71 New Library World 72 New Library World The Library World
"Notices of New Books" (1871) 31 Law Magazine and Law Review 339
"Book Notices" (1872) 1 Law Magazine and Review 737
"Book Notices" (1873) 2 Law Magazine and Review 1140 Law magazine and review: a quarterly review of jurisprudence The Law Magazine and Review: For Both Branches of the Legal Profession at Home and Abroad
"Book Reviews" (1875) 4 Law Magazine and Review 281
"Short Reviews" (1875) 1 Law Magazine and Review (Fourth Series) 357 (November 1875) The Law Magazine and Review: For Both Branches of the Legal Profession at Home and Abroad
(1877) 11 Law Magazine and Review 143 The Law Magazine and Review: Or Quarterty Journal of Jurisprudence Law magazine and review: a quarterly review of jurisprudence
(1879) 4 Law Magazine and Review 113 Google Books
"Notices of New Works" (1872) 36 Justice of the Peace 329 (25 May)
"Notices of New Works" (1875) 39 Justice of the Peace 122 (20 February)
"Notices of New Works" (1877) 41 Justice of the Peace 188 (24 March)
"Notices of New Works" (1878) 42 Justice of the Peace 297 and 696 Google Books
(1929) 93 Justice of the Peace and Local Government Review 799 Google Books

External links
First Revised Edition, from Internet Archive:
 1235-1685 vol 1,
 1688-1770 vol 2,
 1770-1800 vol 3, another 3,
 1801-1811 vol 4,
 5
 6
 1831-1836 vol 7,
 8
 1843-1846 vol 9
 First revised Edition, from Google Books:
 1770-1800 vol 3
Second Revised Edition. Catalogue record and digitised copies from HathiTrust.
 -
 1714-1800 vol 02
 1801-1814 vol 03
 1814-1830 vol 04
 1830-1836 vol 05
 1837-1842 vol 06
 -
 1847-1852 vol 08
 1852-1857 vol 09
 -
 -
 1868-1871 vol 12
 1872-1875 vol 13
 1876-1880 vol 14
 1881-1883 vol 15
 -
 1887-1879 vol 17
 1880-1882 vol 18
 1883-1885 vol 19
 1886-1900 vol 20

Legal literature
Statutory law
Law of the United Kingdom